The 1999 All-Ireland Intermediate Hurling Championship was the 16th staging of the All-Ireland Intermediate Hurling Championship since its establishment by the Gaelic Athletic Association in 1961. The championship began on 30 May 1999 and ended on 25 September 1999.

Limerick entered the championship as the defending champions, however, they were beaten by Waterford in the Munster first round.

The All-Ireland final was played on 25 September 1999 at St. Brendan's Park in Birr, between Galway and Kilkenny, in what was their first ever meeting in the final. Galway won the match by 3-13 to 2-10 to claim their first ever championship title.

Kilkenny's Ollie O'Connor was the championship's top scorer with 2-28.

Results

Leinster Intermediate Hurling Championship

Leinster quarter-finals

Leinster semi-finals

Leinster final

Munster Intermediate Hurling Championship

Munster first round

Munster semi-finals

Munster final

All-Ireland Intermediate Hurling Championship

All-Ireland semi-finals

All-Ireland final

Championship statistics

Top scorers

Top scorers overall

Top scorers in a single game

Results

External links
 Rolls of honour

Intermediate
All-Ireland Intermediate Hurling Championship